Nesterov, until 1938 known by its German name  and in 1938-1946 as Ebenrode, is a town and the administrative center of Nesterovsky District in Kaliningrad Oblast, Russia, located  east of Kaliningrad, near the Russian-Lithuanian border on the railway connecting Kaliningrad Oblast with Moscow. Population figures:

History
In the Middle Ages, the area in Old Prussia had been settled by the Nadruvian tribe of the Baltic Prussians. It was conquered by the Teutonic Knights in about 1276 and incorporated into the State of the Teutonic Order. From the 15th century onwards, the Knights largely resettled the lands with Samogitian and Lithuanian colonists. Since 1466, it was part of the Kingdom of Poland as a fief held by the Teutonic Order.

The settlement itself was first mentioned as Stallupoenen, or Stallupönen, in 1539, named after a nearby river called Stalupė in Lithuanian. At that time, with the secularization of the Order's Prussian lands in 1525, Stallupönen had already become part of the Duchy of Prussia, a Polish fief which in 1618 was inherited by the Hohenzollern margraves of Brandenburg. Stallupönen then belonged to Brandenburg-Prussia and became a part of the Kingdom of Prussia in 1701. The population was decimated during the Great Northern War plague outbreak in 1710. The settlement was resettled by Lithuanian and German colonists in the following years. King Frederick William I granted it town privileges in 1722. Lithuanian poet Kristijonas Donelaitis was the rector of the local school in 1740–1743. Like other cities in the region during the Seven Years' War between 1757 and 1762, it was occupied by the Russian forces. It became part of the newly formed Province of East Prussia in 1773. During the Prussian-led unification of Germany, Stallupönen became a part of the German Empire in 1871. In 1885, the town had a largely Lithuanian-speaking population of 4,181, often employed in agriculture. With the construction of railways, the town became well-acquainted to travelers, as it was the last stop on the German-Russian frontier. Here, travelers made the transfer from standard gauge railway carriages of western Europe to the broad gauge carriages of Russia.

In August 1914, the city and the surrounding area were a focal point of Battle of Stallupönen between Russian and Imperial German armies, an opening battle on the Eastern Front of World War I. It was occupied by the Russian army between August 18, 1914 and February 18, 1915.

Because of the Lithuanian minority living there, Lithuania tried unsuccessfully to obtain the town from Germany after regaining independence following World War I. Because "Stallupönen" sounded too "un-German", the Nazi regime renamed the town Ebenrode in 1938.

During World War II, the Germans operated a subcamp of the Stalag I-A prisoner-of-war camp for Allied POWs in the town. From June 1941 to June 1942, the Germans also operated the  POW camp for Allied officers, and in September–October 1942, they operated the Stalag I-D POW camp, which was eventually relocated to Šilutė in German-occupied Lithuania. The town was overrun by the Soviet Red Army during World War II on January 13, 1945. The region was transferred from Germany to the Russian SFSR in 1945 and made a part of Kaliningrad Oblast. In 1946, the town, whose German inhabitants had been largely evacuated or expelled in accordance with the Potsdam Agreement, was renamed Nesterov after Sergey Nesterov, a Soviet war hero who was killed in the vicinity.

Administrative and municipal status
Within the framework of administrative divisions, Nesterov serves as the administrative center of Nesterovsky District. As an administrative division, it is incorporated within Nesterovsky District as the town of district significance of Nesterov. As a municipal division, the town of district significance of Nesterov is incorporated within Nesterovsky Municipal District as Nesterovskoye Urban Settlement.

Culture
Today Nesterov is one of the cultural centers of the Lithuanian minority in Russia.

Notable people

 Max Askanazy (1865-1940), German-Swiss pathologist
 Friedrich Philipp Dulk (1788–1851), German pharmacist and chemist
 Walther Funk (1890–1960), German economist and Nazi official
 Werner Gitt (born 1937), German engineer
 Günter Rimkus (1928–2015), German dramaturge and opera manager
 Felix Steiner (1896–1966), German officer who served in both World War I and World War II
 Oscar Werwath (1880–1948), German engineer and academic administrator
 Ulrich Woronowicz (1928–2011), German Evangelical pastor, theologian and social activist

References

Notes

Sources

Cities and towns in Kaliningrad Oblast
Nesterovsky District